Las Palmas is a census-designated place (CDP) in Zapata County in the U.S. state of Texas. It was a new CDP from the 2010 census with a population of 67. It is part of the Zapata Micropolitan Statistical Area.

Geography

References

Census-designated places in Zapata County, Texas
Census-designated places in Texas